This is a list of cases reported in volume 256 of United States Reports, decided by the Supreme Court of the United States in 1921.

Justices of the Supreme Court at the time of volume 256 U.S. 

The Supreme Court is established by Article III, Section 1 of the Constitution of the United States, which says: "The judicial Power of the United States, shall be vested in one supreme Court . . .". The size of the Court is not specified; the Constitution leaves it to Congress to set the number of justices. Under the Judiciary Act of 1789 Congress originally fixed the number of justices at six (one chief justice and five associate justices). Since 1789 Congress has varied the size of the Court from six to seven, nine, ten, and back to nine justices (always including one chief justice).

When the cases in volume 256 were decided the Court comprised the following nine members:

Notable Cases in volume 256 U.S.

Block v. Hirsh
In Block v. Hirsh,   256 U.S. 135 (1921), the Supreme Court upheld a temporary rent control law in the District of Columbia. It set a precedent in American law that government can regulate housing conditions during times of emergency to maintain or improve living conditions. In 1924, however, the rental property statute upheld in the case reached the Court for a second review. This time, despite the language being the same, the statute was struck down. The Court held that the emergency necessitating the measure had passed, and that that which "justified interference with ordinarily existing property rights as of 1919 had come to an end by 1922."

Newberry v. United States
Newberry v. United States,  256 U.S. 232 (1921), is a decision by the Supreme Court which held that the United States Constitution did not grant the United States Congress the authority to regulate political party primaries or nomination processes.  The Court struck down 1911 amendments to the Federal Corrupt Practices Act which placed spending limits on candidate and political election committee spending in primaries or other nomination processes for federal office.

Brown v. United States
In Brown v. United States,  256 U.S. 335 (1921), the Supreme Court held that if a person is attacked, and that person reasonably believes that they are in immediate danger of death or grievous bodily injury, then they have no duty to retreat and may stand their ground; if they kill the attacker they have not exceeded the bounds of lawful self-defense.  In writing the opinion, Justice Oliver Wendell Holmes stated “Detached reflection cannot be demanded in the presence of an uplifted knife. Therefore, in this Court, at least, it is not a condition of immunity that one in that situation should pause to consider whether a reasonable man might not think it possible to fly with safety or to disable his assailant rather than to kill him.”

Dillon v. Gloss
Dillon v. Gloss,  256 U.S. 368 (1921), is a case in which the Supreme Court held that Congress, when proposing a constitutional amendment under the authority given to it by Article V of the Constitution, may fix a definite period for its ratification, and further, that the reasonableness of the seven-year period, fixed by Congress in the resolution proposing the Eighteenth Amendment is beyond question.

Citation style 

Under the Judiciary Act of 1789 the federal court structure at the time comprised District Courts, which had general trial jurisdiction; Circuit Courts, which had mixed trial and appellate (from the US District Courts) jurisdiction; and the United States Supreme Court, which had appellate jurisdiction over the federal District and Circuit courts—and for certain issues over state courts. The Supreme Court also had limited original jurisdiction (i.e., in which cases could be filed directly with the Supreme Court without first having been heard by a lower federal or state court). There were one or more federal District Courts and/or Circuit Courts in each state, territory, or other geographical region.

The Judiciary Act of 1891 created the United States Courts of Appeals and reassigned the jurisdiction of most routine appeals from the district and circuit courts to these appellate courts. The Act created nine new courts that were originally known as the "United States Circuit Courts of Appeals." The new courts had jurisdiction over most appeals of lower court decisions. The Supreme Court could review either legal issues that a court of appeals certified or decisions of court of appeals by writ of certiorari. On January 1, 1912, the effective date of the Judicial Code of 1911, the old Circuit Courts were abolished, with their remaining trial court jurisdiction transferred to the U.S. District Courts.

Bluebook citation style is used for case names, citations, and jurisdictions.
 "# Cir." = United States Court of Appeals
 e.g., "3d Cir." = United States Court of Appeals for the Third Circuit
 e.g.,"D. Mass." = United States District Court for the District of Massachusetts
 "E." = Eastern; "M." = Middle; "N." = Northern; "S." = Southern; "W." = Western
 e.g.,"M.D. Ala." = United States District Court for the Middle District of Alabama
 "Ct. Cl." = United States Court of Claims
 The abbreviation of a state's name alone indicates the highest appellate court in that state's judiciary at the time.
 e.g.,"Pa." = Supreme Court of Pennsylvania
 e.g.,"Me." = Supreme Judicial Court of Maine

List of cases in volume 256 U.S.

Notes and references

External links
  Case reports in volume 256 from Library of Congress
  Case reports in volume 256 from Court Listener
  Case reports in volume 256 from the Caselaw Access Project of Harvard Law School
  Case reports in volume 256 from Google Scholar
  Case reports in volume 256 from Justia
  Case reports in volume 256 from Open Jurist
 Website of the United States Supreme Court
 United States Courts website about the Supreme Court
 National Archives, Records of the Supreme Court of the United States
 American Bar Association, How Does the Supreme Court Work?
 The Supreme Court Historical Society